General Brian Peddle (born 8 August 1957) is the CEO and 21st General of The Salvation Army since 3 August 2018. He was formerly the 26th Chief of the Staff of The Salvation Army from 1 November 2015 until 3 August 2018 under General André Cox.

Career
General Peddle and his wife, Commissioner Rosalie Peddle, were commissioned in 1977 as Salvation Army officers. Since then, General Peddle has held several appointments, including service as a divisional leader in New Zealand and as Chief Secretary in the UK. He led their home territory (Canada and Bermuda) for three years until his appointment as Chief of the Staff. Peddle currently serves as the organisation's international leader, general, and CEO.

Appointments
Canada & Bermuda Territory
 Corps (July 1977), Training College (December 1979),
 Divisional Headquarters (June 1985), Corps (July 1988),
 Divisional Headquarters (June 2000),
 Divisional Commander (June 2001)
New Zealand, Fiji and Tonga Territory
 Divisional Commander, Northern Division (February 2007)
United Kingdom Territory with the Republic of Ireland
 Chief Secretary (June 2009)Canada and Bermuda Territory Territorial Commander (July 2011)International Headquarters'''
 International Secretary for the Americas and Caribbean (September 2014)
 Chief of the Staff (November 2015)
 General of the Salvation Army (August 2018)

Election as General

On 24 May 2018, the 19th High Council announced that Commissioner Peddle would become the organisation's 21st General on 3 August 2018, succeeding Andre Cox. He is the fifth Canadian to hold the position, and the second from Newfoundland and Labrador.

References

1957 births
Living people
Commissioners in The Salvation Army
Canadian Salvationists
Place of birth missing (living people)